The 2012 Fareham Borough Council elections took take place on 3 May 2012 to elect half the members of Fareham Borough Council in Hampshire, England. The Conservative Party are currently the largest party on the council.

The Conservative Party held every seat they defended and gained one from the Lib Dems, in Fareham North West, which saw Dave Whittingham unseat Eric Dunn.

The closest to an upset came in Stubbington where 22-year-old Christopher Wood for the UK Independence Party came second with 34.4% of the vote, behind the Conservative's Kay Mandry, who won 38.8%.

After the election, the composition of the council was:
Conservative 24
Liberal Democrat 6
Independent 1

Election results
The election saw the Conservatives retain control of the council after winning 13 seats compared to 2 for the Liberal Democrats.

Ward results

Fareham East

Fareham North

Fareham North West

Fareham South

Fareham West

Hill Head

Locks Heath

Park Gate

Portchester East

Portchester West

Sarisbury

Stubbington

Titchfield

Titchfield Common

Warsash

References

2012
2012 English local elections
2010s in Hampshire